The rivière aux Araignées (in English: Spider River) is a tributary on the south shore of Lake Mégantic whose outfall is the Chaudière River which flows northward to flow into the south shore of the St. Lawrence River.

The Araignées River flows in the municipalities of Saint-Augustin-de-Woburn and Frontenac, in the Le Granit Regional County Municipality (MRC), in the administrative region of Estrie, in Quebec in Canada.

Geography 

The river is joined by several streams that drain the western flank of Mont Merrill, Caribou Mountain and several border mountains between Quebec and Maine (United States) which surround a valley which constitutes its watershed, drained by several branches of the Chutes brook, the Caribou brook and the Cascades brook. It flows between Mont Louise and Mont Flat Top before flowing onto the south-eastern shore of Lac aux Araignées.

Upper course of the river (segment of )

From its source, the "rivière aux Araignées" flows over:
  north-west, up to the confluence of "Ruisseau des Cascades" (coming from the east);
  towards the north-west, to the confluence of a stream (coming from the east);
  north-west, up to a road bridge;
  north-west, to the confluence of the Club brook;
  west, to the southeast shore of lac aux Araignées;
  towards the west, crossing lac aux Araignées, to the dam located at its mouth.

Lower course of the river (segment of )

From lac aux Araignées, the river takes the name of discharge of lac aux Araignées and flows to:
  southward, to the north shore of a bay in Lac des Joncs (Mégantic);
  south then north-west, to Lac des Joncs.

Toponymy 

The toponym "rivière aux Araignées" was made official on December 5, 1968, at the Commission de toponymie du Québec.

See also 

 List of rivers of Quebec

References 

Rivers of Estrie
Le Granit Regional County Municipality